The Bone Snatcher is a British-Canadian horror film directed by Jason Wolfsohn and starring Scott Bairstow, Rachel Shelley, and Adrienne Pearce. The film is based on a screenplay from Malcolm Kohll and Gordon Render.

Plot

When workers begin disappearing in a South African mine, Dr. Zack Straker and a search team are sent into the desert to find out why the geologists of a diamond expedition have lost radio contact.   They arrive at camp of the scientists in the desert, but soon find the neatly gnawed bones of their colleagues and a trail that leads them to a strange rock formation. Once at camp they find only the cleanly gnawed bones of the workers. Soon it becomes clear that there is a murderous beast on the loose.

The researchers decided to investigate the structure, but in the gathering darkness, sheer hell breaks loose as the creature, composed of a swarm of ant-like insects wrapped around the bones of its victims, hunts them for their bones.  A game of cat and mouse continues through the desert, with the team being slowly picked off and the bug and bone monster eventually being chased down in a derelict mine.

Zack finds it hard to decide to kill the yellow queen brain that controls the swarm that has killed dozens of people, but he eventually does so.  Suddenly, the derelict mine structure starts to fall down, leaving Zack and Mikki to run back to the truck - where they find they are now the only survivors of the team.  The film ends with Mikki driving into the distance, apparently oblivious that a box loaded into her taxi contains another queen brain.

Cast

Production

The film was shot in the year 2002 in the South African city Cape Town and in the desert from Namibia.

Release
The Bone Snatcher was released on DVD by First Look Pictures on December 23, 2003.  It was re-released by Anchor Bay Entertainment on July 26 the following year. First Look later released the film on Steelbook on May 5, 2009.

Reception

Critical reception for The Bone Snatcher has been predominantly negative.

David Nusair of ReelFilm Reviews awarded the film a negative 1 out of a possible 4 stars, writing, "More than anything else, The Bone Snatcher is just dull. There's barely enough material here to fill a 15-minute short, let alone a 90-minute feature - and for a horror film, it's shockingly non-horrific".
Wayne Southworth of The Spinning Image gave the film 4/10 stars, criticizing the garbled language, which made understanding what the actor's were saying difficult. Southworth, however, commended the film's desert location as the best thing about the movie.

References

External links 
 
 
 

2003 films
2000s English-language films
English-language South African films
South African horror films
British horror films
English-language Canadian films
2003 horror films
British monster movies
Films shot in Namibia
Canadian monster movies
Films shot in South Africa
Films set in deserts
Films set in Namibia
Syfy original films
2000s monster movies
American monster movies
2000s American films
2000s Canadian films
2000s British films